Luis Patricio Ormazábal Mozó (born February 12, 1979), known as Patricio Ormazábal, is a Chilean football manager and former footballer who played as a midfielder.

Club career
As a child, Ormazábal was with Escuela de Fútbol Municipal de Curicó (Municipal Football Academy of Curicó), later named Juventud 2000, what was founded by the former professional footballer Luis Hernán Álvarez. Next, he moved to Universidad Católica youth ranks. Once in Universidad Católica, he started to alternate with the starting lineup ever since his debut in 1997. He played all over the midfield either as a defensive or double 5, side-half or even as an attacking midfielder. His role on the team became bigger each year earning the right to be 2nd team captain after Miguel Ramírez.

In 2003, he was transferred to San Lorenzo de Almagro and played under ex-teammate Néstor Raúl Gorosito. He only lasted half season there, and moved on to Arsenal de Sarandí.

In the 2004 offseason, he struck all Universidad Católica supporters by signing with archrival Universidad de Chile. This move was considered as a huge back stab from the former captain.

A year later, he was transferred to Dorados de Sinaloa, where he did not find much playing time. He soon returned to Universidad de Chile for the 2006 season making his relationship with Universidad Católica's fans even worse.

In 2007, he returned to Católica, after coach José del Solar allowed the transfer to go down. He has stated that he finally feels at home, at his youth club, but fans have not given him a proper welcome.

International career
Ormazábal represented Chile at under-17 level in the 2017 South American Championship and at under-20 level in the 1999 South American Championship.

In 2000, he represented Chile in both the 2000 CONMEBOL Pre-Olympic Tournament and the 2000 Summer Olynmpics, winning the bronze medal.

At senior level, he made seven appearances for Chile between 2000 and 2003.

Honours

Club
Universidad Católica
 Primera División de Chile (2): 1997 Apertura, 2002 Apertura

International
 Olympic bronze medal (1): 2000

References

External links

1979 births
Living people
People from Curicó
Chilean people of Basque descent
Chilean footballers
Chile international footballers
Chile youth international footballers
Chile under-20 international footballers
Club Deportivo Universidad Católica footballers
San Lorenzo de Almagro footballers
Arsenal de Sarandí footballers
Universidad de Chile footballers
Dorados de Sinaloa footballers
C.D. Huachipato footballers
Curicó Unido footballers
Chilean Primera División players
Argentine Primera División players
Liga MX players
Primera B de Chile players
Chilean expatriate footballers
Chilean expatriate sportspeople in Argentina
Expatriate footballers in Argentina
Chilean expatriate sportspeople in Mexico
Expatriate footballers in Mexico
Footballers at the 2000 Summer Olympics
Olympic footballers of Chile
Olympic bronze medalists for Chile
Olympic medalists in football
Medalists at the 2000 Summer Olympics
Chilean football managers
Club Deportivo Universidad Católica managers
Magallanes managers
Chile national under-20 football team managers
Chilean Primera División managers
Primera B de Chile managers
Association football midfielders